Lešany is a municipality and village in Benešov District in the Central Bohemian Region of the Czech Republic. It has about 800 inhabitants.

Administrative parts
Villages of Břežany and Nová Ves are administrative parts of Lešany.

Sights
The municipality is known for of the Military Museum Lešany that is located in a former artillery barracks.

Notable people
František Hrubín (1910–1971), poet and writer; grew up here
Libuše Benešová (born 1948), politician and former mayor of Lešany; lives here

References

Villages in Benešov District